The North Central Unit is a prison located in Calico Rock, Arkansas. It is managed by the Arkansas Department of Corrections.

History 
The North Central Unit, sometimes known as the Calico Rock Prison, was founded as a way to bring jobs to the area and to build a prison facility in the northern part of the state. At the time of its founding, local residents protested against the facility being built. 

In 2010, the prison expanded to house an additional 100 beds.

References

External links 
 North Central Unit, Arkansas Department of Corrections

Prisons in Arkansas
Izard County, Arkansas